Gianmarco Nicosia (born 12 February 1998) is an Italian water polo player. He competed in the 2020 Summer Olympics.

References

1998 births
Living people
Water polo players at the 2020 Summer Olympics
Italian male water polo players
Olympic water polo players of Italy
World Aquatics Championships medalists in water polo
21st-century Italian people